Chromium(II) silicide or chromium disilicide is an inorganic compound of chromium and silicon. Its chemical formula is CrSi2. It is a p-type thermoelectric semiconductor with an indirect bandgap of 0.35 eV.

References

Chromium(II) compounds
Group 6 silicides